The  Green Bay Packers season was the franchise's 97th season overall, 95th in the National Football League, and the tenth under head coach Mike McCarthy. With a Week 15 win over the Oakland Raiders, the Packers clinched a playoff spot for the seventh consecutive season, but they failed to win their fifth consecutive NFC North title after a Week 17 loss to the Minnesota Vikings as does matching their 12–4 record from last season. As a result, the fifth-seeded Packers traveled to Washington to face the fourth-seeded Redskins in the wild-card round. They beat the Redskins 35–18, and then traveled to Arizona for a rematch against the second-seeded Arizona Cardinals, where the Packers' season ended as they lost to the Cardinals in overtime, 20–26. One highlight of the Packers' season was a stunning come-from-behind victory over their division rivals Detroit Lions, which resulted in a 61-yard game-winning Hail Mary pass from quarterback Aaron Rodgers to tight end Richard Rodgers II as time expired.

Offseason

Free agents

Draft

Notes
 The Packers received two compensatory selections in the sixth round of the 2015 draft.
 The Packers traded picks No. 166 and No. 247 to receive No. 147 from the New England Patriots.

Staff

Final roster

Starters

Regular season

Offense

Defense

Playoffs

Offense

Defense

Standings

Division

Conference

Schedule

Preseason

Regular season

Note: Intra-division opponents are in bold text.

Postseason

Game summaries

Regular season

Week 1: at Chicago Bears

The Packers opened their season against their famed arch-rival, the Bears. The Bears, behind the strong running of Matt Forte, had the early lead against the Packers, but the Packers were able to gain the advantage in the second half behind Aaron Rodgers' three touchdown passes, two of which were to James Jones, who had been cut by the New York Giants just a week prior. The Packers clinched the win with a Clay Matthews interception, followed by an Eddie Lacy touchdown run, giving the Packers their tenth win over the Bears in the rivals' 12 most recent games.

Week 2: vs. Seattle Seahawks

The Packers' home opener featured a rematch of the 2014 NFC Championship Game between the Packers and the Seattle Seahawks, who had won in their previous three meetings with the Packers, all of them in Seattle. The Packers got the early 13–3 lead, helped by James Jones' 3rd touchdown reception in only two games, but the Seahawks were able to rally back on two Russell Wilson touchdown passes, giving Seattle a 17–13 lead in the third quarter. The Packers then scored 14 unanswered points, aided by two Seahawks turnovers and shut down the Seahawks offense, holding their star running back, Marshawn Lynch, to only 42 yards rushing with a 2.7 yards per carry average. The Packers won 27–17, building up a 2–0 record and adding to a ten-game winning streak at Lambeau Field.

Week 3: vs. Kansas City Chiefs

The Chiefs came in as one of only two teams in the NFL, the other being the Houston Texans, who have never lost at Lambeau Field (until Week 13 of the 2016 NFL season.) The Packers dominated the Chiefs for most of the game, with Aaron Rodgers throwing five touchdown passes, though the Chiefs managed to outscore the Packers 21–14 in the second half. The Packers' 38–28 victory ended the Chiefs' being undefeated at Lambeau and extended the Packers' own home winning streak to eleven games.

Week 4: at San Francisco 49ers

With the win, the Packers improved to 4–0. The Packers not only got their first win over the 49ers since 2010, but it was also the Packers' first victory over Colin Kaepernick.

Week 5: vs. St. Louis Rams

Aaron Rodgers threw his first interception at home since 2012, which was picked off by James Laurinaitis. The Packers' defense intercepted St. Louis quarterback Nick Foles four times, one of them returned for a touchdown by Quinten Rollins for 45 yards.

The Packers went to 5–0 for the first time since 2011.

Week 6: vs. San Diego Chargers

The Packers wore new throwback uniforms, replicas of their uniforms from the 1940s, for their game against the Chargers.

The Packers took another early lead, helped by James Starks' two touchdown runs, but the Chargers came back, with Philip Rivers hitting key passes to Keenan Allen. The two teams traded points in the second half, with the Chargers able to keep pace with the Packers. In the last play of the game, Packers rookie cornerback Damarious Randall has deflected what could have been a game-tying touchdown pass from San Diego quarterback Philip Rivers.

With the win, the Packers entered their bye week at 6–0. It is also the second time the Packers started 6–0 after the 2011 season.

Week 7: Bye week
No game. Green Bay had a bye week.

Week 8: at Denver Broncos

The Packers flew to Denver for a duel with Peyton Manning and the undefeated Denver Broncos. The Broncos wore their alternate blue uniforms with white pants as worn in Super Bowl XXXII.

Packers cornerbacks Sam Shields and rookie cornerback Quinten Rollins suffered a shoulder injury in the game and their returns were questionable.

The Broncos took the lead early in the first quarter when Ronnie Hillman scored a 1-yard touchdown.

In the second quarter, Hillman scored another touchdown and the Broncos led 14–0. The Broncos lead became 17–0 when Brandon McManus made a 50-yard field goal. Von Miller was injured during the second quarter. The Packers struck back when Eddie Lacy scored on a 2-yard touchdown run. They trailed 7–17 at halftime.

In the third quarter, the Packers cut Denver's lead to seven when Mason Crosby made a 56-yard field goal. Denver extended their lead to 24–10 when C. J. Anderson made a 28-yard run.

Denver continued to dominate when Brandon McManus made a 24-yard field goal and DeMarcus Ware sacked Aaron Rodgers for a safety, making the score 10–29.

The Packers defense finally recorded an interception when Damarious Randall picked off Peyton Manning. In this game, the Broncos held Rodgers to 77 yards passing, the lowest of his starting career in a game where he hasn't come off with injury.

Week 9: at Carolina Panthers
Green Bay would travel to Charlotte to take on the undefeated Panthers. The Panthers would lead all game. The Panthers would lead 37–14 at one point. Green Bay would try to come back, but they wouldn't, as Carolina hung on for the win. Despite the loss, Aaron Rodgers would throw 4 touchdown passes with only 1 interception.

With the loss, the Packers fell to 6–2.

Week 10: vs. Detroit Lions

For the first time since 1991, the Packers lost to the Lions at home.

Week 11: at Minnesota Vikings

The Packers broke their three-game losing streak with a victory in Minnesota. Green Bay held Minnesota to two scores, including a 47-yard pass from Teddy Bridgewater to Kyle Rudolph for the game's first touchdown. The Vikings' extra point try went wide, and after three Green Bay field goals, the Packers closed out the first half with a TD pass from Rodgers to Cobb to take a 10-point lead. Adrian Peterson scored in the third quarter to bring the Vikings within six points of the Packers, but Green Bay got it back with a long pass from Rodgers to James Jones in the corner of the end zone. Two second-half Crosby field goals brought Green Bay's total to 30, and the Vikings relinquished their brief first-place standing in the NFC North back to the Pack.

Week 12: vs. Chicago Bears
Thanksgiving Day game
On a night where the Packers would retire long-time star quarterback Brett Favre's jersey, Chicago would upset Green Bay, winning 17–13. The Packers had a chance near the end to steal the win from Chicago, but the Bears defense would force a turnover on downs to end the game.

With the loss, the Packers fell to 7–4.

Week 13 at Detroit Lions

In a game dubbed "The Miracle in Motown" by Jim Nantz, the Packers trailed 20–0 at halftime before pulling off a comeback in the second half. This game is well known by Packer fans for its ending. Towards the end, the Packers tried to lateral the ball to get down the field and score a game-winning touchdown. The play looked like a total bust, as Aaron Rodgers was wrapped up and brought down, seemingly ending the game. However, the Lions were called for a controversial facemask penalty that gave the Packers one more chance on an untimed down. On the next play, Rodgers threw a 61-yard Hail Mary pass to Richard Rodgers II to end the game. The ball traveled 68 yards through the air, making it the longest touchdown pass in NFL history by air. The pass gave the Packers a 27–23 win. Some Packers fans refer to this play as "Hail Rodgers" or "Rodgers to Rodgers".

With the win, the Packers improved to 8–4.

Week 14: vs. Dallas Cowboys
In a rematch of "Dez Bryant's no catch game", the Packers rattled the depleted Cowboys 28–7. This was the first game Mike McCarthy took back play-calling duties after relinquishing it to Tom Clements.

With the win, the Packers improved to 9–4.

Week 15: at Oakland Raiders
The Packers would travel to Oakland to take on the Raiders. The defense had a good day, intercepting Derek Carr twice, as the Packers won 30–20.

With the win, the Packers improved to 10–4.

Week 16: at Arizona Cardinals
In this game, Aaron Rodgers suffered, what many call, the worst game of his career, as the Packers got destroyed 38–8 in Glendale to a good Arizona Cardinals team. The Packers would commit 4 turnovers in this game and Rodgers would be sacked a career-high 9 times.

With the mistake-filled loss, the Packers fell to 10–5, and now have to face Minnesota next week for the NFC North championship.

Week 17: vs. Minnesota Vikings

The Packers looked to complete a 2–0 season sweep against the Vikings in order to win the division, but their hopes died late in the fourth quarter as Aaron Rodgers attempted another hail mary play that ended up being tipped by the Vikings defense, allowing Minnesota to win the division title for the first time since 2009 and preventing Green Bay from winning the division title for the fifth straight season. This was also the first time in franchise history that the Packers would go 0–3 at home against their division.
 
This loss dropped the Packers to 10–6, splitting the season series with Minnesota, 1–1.

Postseason

NFC Wild Card Playoffs: at (4) Washington Redskins
The Packers would play in Washington for the first playoff game. The first half was all Redskins, as they jumped out to an 11–0 lead during the early point of the second quarter. However, the Packers would come back, and would outscore Washington 35-7 the rest of the game.

With the win, the Packers advanced to the Divisional Playoffs.

NFC Divisional Playoffs: at (2) Arizona Cardinals

In a rematch of week 16's game, the Packers went back to Arizona for a showdown with the Cardinals. This game was a lot closer, as the Packers lost a shootout 26–20 in overtime. This game was wild, especially towards the end. In the fourth quarter, trailing by 7 with less than 2 minutes left, facing a 4th and 20, the Packers converted with Rodgers completing a 61-yard pass to receiver Jeff Janis to set the Packers up. Later, with 5 seconds left, Aaron Rodgers would throw another Hail Mary pass, this time to Janis, and to tie the game at 20. In overtime, the Cardinals would get the ball first. On the first play from scrimmage, Carson Palmer would complete a pass to Larry Fitzgerald, who was able to run through the Packers defense for a gain of 75 yards and be tackled at the Green Bay 4 yard line. Two plays later, the Cardinals would win it after Fitzgerald took it in on a flip from Palmer to end the game and send Arizona to the NFC Championship game.

With the loss, the Packers ended their season with an overall record of 11–7.

Statistics

Regular season statistical leaders

Best game performances

Awards

See also
 2015 NFL season
 Miracle in Motown (Week 13)

References

External links
 

Green Bay
Green Bay Packers seasons
Green Bay Packers